University of Computer Studies (Maubin), located in Maubin Township, about  west of Yangon, is one of three computer universities in Ayeyarwady Region, which provides education in the area of ICT. The university offers both computer science and computer technology to its undergraduate students.

History 
Government Computer College (Maubin) started up on first January 2003. It was upgraded as Computer University (Maubin) on 20 January 2007. In 2015, It was renamed as University of Computer Studies (Maubin).

Degree programs 
University of Computer Studies (Maubin) offers five-year bachelor's degree programs in computer science and computer technology. The school's language of instruction is English.

Faculties and staff

Rector 
Professor Dr.Thandar Thein

Rector,
Ph.D.(IT)

University of Computer Studies (Maubin)

Academic 
 Faculty of Computer Science
 Faculty of Computer Systems and Technologies
 Faculty of Information Science
 Faculty of Computing
 Department of Information Technology Supporting & Maintenance
 Department of Application
 Network Design & Maintenance
 Department of Languages
 Department of Myanmar
 Department of English
 Department of Natural Science (Physics)

Administration 
 Department of Student Affairs 
 Department of Staff Affairs 
 Department of Finance
 Department of Estate Engineering

Rectors/principals

Student life

Students' union 

In 2019, students' union is officially established, is called UCSMUB Students' Union.

Student associations/clubs 
During the 2017–2018 academic year, IT Club was founded with the support of professors and teachers, and it was recognized by the rector of the university. And it is known as IT Club UCSMUB.

Music Club, Dance Club, Handmade Club and E-Sport Club are established as students' clubs by the students' union.

Product show 
On February 22, 2019, the Product show of the university was held. Students showed 41 products in total. "Information System of Private Hospital", "Trip Advisor" and "Garden System" won the first, second, third prize respectively in the product show. "Smart Restaurant", "APineKine" and "Smart Township System" won the consolation prizes.

External links 
 Official website
 Subdomain of Ministry of Education, Myanmar

References 

 
Universities and colleges in Myanmar
Universities and colleges in Ayeyarwady Region
Educational institutions established in 2003
2003 establishments in Myanmar